The C. D. Rogers House is a home in Savannah, Georgia, United States. It is located at 120 West Jones Street and was constructed in 1871. It was built for Cornelius Decatur Rogers.

The building is part of the Savannah Historic District. 
In a survey for the Historic Savannah Foundation, Mary Lane Morrison found the building to be of significant status.

See also
Buildings in Savannah Historic District

References

Houses in Savannah, Georgia
Houses completed in 1871
Savannah Historic District